Hastings—Frontenac—Lennox and Addington was a federal and provincial electoral district in Ontario, Canada, that was represented in the House of Commons of Canada from 1984 to 2003, and in the Legislative Assembly of Ontario from 1999 to 2007.

Geography
The federal  riding was created in 1976 when Hastings—Frontenac was renamed. The riding initially  consisted of:

 that part of the County of Frontenac including and lying northerly of the Townships of Portland, Loughborough, Storrington and Pittsburg, but excluding the southwest part of the Township of Pittsburg;
 that part of the County of Hastings including and lying northerly of the Townships of Marmora, Madoc and Elzevir;
 the County of Lennox and Addington, but excluding the Township of Armherst Island.

In 1987, the riding was re-defined to consist of:

 that part of the County of Frontenac including and lying northerly of the Townships of Portland, Loughborough, Storrington and Pittsburg, but excluding the southwest part of the Township of Pittsburg;
 the County of Lennox and Addington but excluding the Township of Armherst Island;
 that part of the County of Hastings lying northerly of the southerly boundary of the townships of Hungerford, Huntingdon and Rawdon and the southerly limit of the Village of Stirling.

In 1996, the riding was re-defined to consist of:

 the County of Frontenac, excepting the City of Kingston, the townships of Howe Island, Kingston and Wolfe Island, and that part of the Township of Pittsburgh lying south of the Macdonald-Cartier Freeway;
 the County of Lennox and Addington;
that part of the County of Hastings lying northerly of the southerly boundary of the townships of Hungerford, Huntingdon and Rawdon, and the southerly limit of the Village of Stirling.

The electoral district was abolished in 2003 when it was redistributed into the Kingston and the Islands, Lanark—Frontenac—Lennox and Addington, and Prince Edward—Hastings ridings.

Members of Parliament

This riding has elected the following Members of Parliament:

Federal election results

|-

|Progressive Conservative
|Bill Vankoughnet
|align="right"|19,996

|Liberal
|Ron Vastokas
|align="right"|9,757

|New Democratic Party
|Donna Forth
|align="right"|5,349

|Independent
|Ross Baker
|align="right"|441

Provincial election results

See also

 List of Canadian federal electoral districts
 Past Canadian electoral districts

External links
 Website of the Parliament of Canada
 Elections Ontario  1999 results and 2003 results

Former federal electoral districts of Ontario
Former provincial electoral districts of Ontario